Meri Arabidze (Georgian: მერი არაბიძე; born 25 February 1994 in Samtredia, Georgia) is a Georgian chess player who holds the FIDE titles of International Master and Woman Grandmaster.

She won three titles at the World Youth Chess Championship: girls under-10 in 2004, girls under-12 in 2005, and girls under-18 in 2011. Arabidze also won three times at the European Youth Chess Championship, in the categories girls under-10 in 2004, girls under-12 in 2006, and girls under-14 in 2008.

Arabidze earned the Woman FIDE Master (WFM) title in 2004, Woman International Master (WIM)	in 2009, Woman Grandmaster (WGM) in 2012, and International Master (IM) in 2014.

In 2014, at the Moscow Open, she won the tournament G, a round-robin event for female students.

Arabidze reached the quarterfinals of the Women's World Chess Championship 2015, after sequentially knocking out Elisabeth Pähtz, Yaniet Marrero Lopez and Viktorija Cmilyte. Then she lost to Harika Dronavalli.

She was part of the Georgian team which won the Women's World Team Chess Championship 2015. In this competition she also won the individual gold medal for board 3. She played for the Georgian national team also in the Women's European Team Chess Championship in 2013 and 2015, winning a team bronze medal in 2015.

References

External links
 
 
 

1994 births
Living people
Female chess players from Georgia (country)
Chess International Masters
Chess woman grandmasters
World Youth Chess Champions
People from Imereti